Moshi Moshi Records is a small London-based record label founded in 1998 by Adrian Pike, Michael McClatchey and Stephen Bass. The label has released music by bands including Lykke Li, Fimber Bravo, Bloc Party, Hot Chip, Late of the Pier, Hot Club De Paris, Kate Nash, Florence and the Machine, Architecture in Helsinki, the Wave Pictures, Disclosure, Sweet Baboo, Tilly and the Wall, Blue Foundation, Slow Club, Happyness, and Au Revoir Simone.  Mates Of State's 2008 record Re-Arrange Us was Moshi Moshi's 50th release. Adrian Pike left the set up within a couple of years leaving McClatchey and Bass to carry on the business. These days it also includes a Management Company who manage Metronomy, Teleman, Slow Club and Sweet Baboo among others and has publishing interests in conjunction with Tummy Touch Music, Eagle-I Music and Blue Mountain Music.

Moshi Moshi also has a Singles Club that has been responsible for the release of records by Florence And The Machine, thecocknbullkid, Fanfarlo, Casiokids, Lykke Li and Friendly Fires amongst others.

It is named after the Japanese telephone greeting "moshi moshi", which translates to hello.

Live events

In 2013 Moshi Moshi hosted a monthly live event at the Servant Jazz Quarters on Bradbury Street in London's Dalston. It has also hosted nights at Hoxton Bar & Kitchen, the Buffalo Bar and the Garage in London. Bands who have previously played include Florence and the Machine, The XX, Lykke Li, Fleet Foxes, The Young Knives, Casiokids, James Yuill, Fimber Bravo, Mariam the Believer, Friendly Fires, and Best Fwends.

Moshi Moshi has also hosted a stage at Iceland Airwaves festival for the last 6 years and has taken bands like Fuck Buttons, Factory Floor, the Drums, Florence and the Machine, Friendly Fires, the Dirty Projectors, Metronomy, Au Revoir Simone, Hot Chip, Architecture in Helsinki, Totally Enormous Extinct Dinosaurs, Kwes and more over to Reykjavik

Stages are also regularly held at the Great Escape Festival in Brighton UK, SWN festival in Cardiff UK and occasionally SXSW.

Compilation album 

In 2008 the label released its first compilation album, named Moshi Moshi Singles Compilation. It featured a number of artists who had released material via the label. Among the artists included were Kate Nash, Late of the Pier and Friendly Fires. A second compilation was released in April 2010, and featured a variety of singles from bands who had signed to the label since the first release including Florence and the Machine.

Artists 

Alterkicks
Anna Meredith
Architecture in Helsinki
Au Revoir Simone
Best Fwends
Bloc Party
Blue Foundation
Breakbot
Casiokids
Casual Sex
Clock Opera
Cerebral Ballzy (with Williams Street Records)
Dananananaykroyd
Dels
 Disclosure
 Diskjokke
Dntel
The Drums
Elle S'appelle
Egyptian Hip Hop
Fanfarlo
Fainting by Numbers
Fans of Kate
Fimber Bravo
Florence and the Machine
Foreign Born
Friendly Fires
Girl Ray
The Grates
Happyness
Hot Chip
Hot Club de Paris
Idiot Glee
Ingo Star Cruiser
J Xaverre
James Yuill
JD
Junkboy

Kate Nash
Late of the Pier
Lo-Fi-Fnk
Lykke Li
The Mae Shi
Mates of State
Matt and Kim
Matt Harding
Meatraffle
Metronomy
New Rhodes
Pacific!
Pedro v Kathryn Williams
The Rakes
Rat:att:agg
The Rhythm Method
Roland Shanks
Roxy Girls
Slow Club
Still Flyin'
Sukpatch
Summer Camp
Sweet Baboo
Team Water Polo
TEETH
Teleman
Tom Vek
Tom Williams & The Boat
thecocknbullkid
The Very Best
Tilly and the Wall
Trophy Wife
Unsound
The Wave Pictures
WooWoos
Yeti
Zan Lyons

See also 
List of record labels
A side project of the Disco Biscuits
Moshi moshi at Wiktionary

References

External links 
 
 
 
  statistics and previews at Last.FM

British independent record labels
Indie rock record labels
Alternative rock record labels
IFPI members